The James S. Polhemus House is a house located in southeast Portland, Oregon, listed on the National Register of Historic Places.

James H. Polhemus, the son of James S., was a general manager of the Port of Portland in the 1930s.

Further reading

See also
 National Register of Historic Places listings in Southeast Portland, Oregon

References

1900 establishments in Oregon
Houses completed in 1900
Houses on the National Register of Historic Places in Portland, Oregon
Buckman, Portland, Oregon
Portland Eastside MPS